Tomáš Hron (born July 25, 1981) is a Czech kickboxer who has fought for the K-1, It's Showtime and SUPERKOMBAT promotions. Former Kings of The Ring, WKA and WKN champion and current Kings of The Ring heavyweight world champion.

Career
He was scheduled to fight Eduardo Mendes on April 13, 2013 in the K-1 World Qualification - K-1 World MAX Elimination super fight but was pulled out because of K-1 financial problems.

He once again became "King of the Ring" K1 Rules Super Heavyweight World Champion beating Sebastian Ciobanu at Time of Gladiators event in Brno, Czech Republic on June 14, 2013. Ciobanu was counted two times in first round, it looked like it will be a KO, but Ciobanu recovered and used speed against bigger and stronger Hron. The two went to distance with Hron taking a unanimous decision victory (30:25, 30:25, 30:26).

He fought member of Glory roster, Jahfarr Wilnis at Final Fight Championship 8 in Zagreb, Croatia on October 25, 2013. Although he was late replacement for Pavel Zhuravlev and deducted two points for clinching, he won the fight by unanimous decision.

On 8 March 2014 he made Glory debout at Glory 14: Zagreb undercard. Originally scheduled to fight Dino Belošević, who withdrew from the fight so he finally rematched Kirk Krouba and once again winning by unanimous decision.

Titles
 ONE Championship
 2021 Road to ONE Heavyweight Kickboxing Tournament Champion. (-120 kg) 

 World Association of Sporting Organizations
 2018 WASO World Champion Title -100 kg

 W5 Professional Kickboxing 
 2016 W5 Intercontinental Super Heavyweight Champion

 Enfusion 2016 Enfusion Live Heavyweight Tournament Runner Up

 King of Kings 2015 KOK WGP 2015 Heavyweight Tournament Runner Up

 King of the Ring 2013 "King of the Ring" K-1 Rules Super Heavyweight World Champion. (-105 kg)
 2009 "King of the Ring" K-1 Rules Super Heavyweight World Champion. (-105 kg)

 World Muay Thai Association 2009 Amsterdam Fight Club WMTA 4man Tournament ChampionWorld Independent Promoters Union 2008 W.I.P.U. "King of the Ring" K-1 Rules Heavyweight Super Champion. (-105 kg)K-1 2007 K-1 Italy Oktagon 2007 tournament championWorld Kickboxing Network 2006 WKN Kickboxing Intercontinental Oriental Rules Champion
 2003 WKN World Champion
 2001 WKN World ChampionKings of the Ring 2004 Kings of the Ring: World GP 85 kg tournament championWorld Kickboxing Association 2004 WKA World Champion
 2002 MS WKA ChampionCzech Muay-Thai Association'''
Czech Champion

Fight record

|-  style="background:#fbb;"
| 2022-12-09 || Loss ||align=left| Errol Zimmerman || | Mega Fight Arena || Istanbul, Turkey || TKO (Injury) || 1  || 1:01 || 

|-  bgcolor="#CCFFCC"
| 2022-10-29 || Win ||align=left| Ivan Bartek ||  Real Fight Arena 5|| Brno, Czech Republic || Decision (Unanimous) || 3 || 3:00

|-  style="background:#fbb;"
| 2022-07-29 || Loss ||align=left| Uku Jürjendal || Yangames Fight Night ve Žlutých lázních  || Prague, Czech Republic || Decision || 3 || 3:00

|-  style="background:#fbb;"
| 2022-06-25 || Loss ||align=left| Sofian Laidouni ||  Le Défi du Nack Muay 7  || Denain, France || Decision (Majority) || 5 || 3:00
|-
! style=background:white colspan=9 |

|-  bgcolor="#CCFFCC"
| 2021-07-29 || Win ||align=left| Olivier Langlois-Ross  ||  Yangames Fight Night 9	|| Prague, Czech Republic || Decision  || 3 || 3:00

|-  bgcolor="#CCFFCC"
| 2021-04-24 || Win ||align=left| Mohamed Amine  || Road to ONE: Night of Warriors 17|| Prague, Czech Republic || Decision (Unanimous) || 3 || 3:00
|-
! style=background:white colspan=9 |
|-  bgcolor="#CCFFCC"
| 2021-04-24 || Win ||align=left| Mehmet Özer || Road to ONE: Night of Warriors 17|| Prague, Czech Republic || TKO (Referee Stoppage) || 2 || 1:23
|-
! style=background:white colspan=9 |
|-  style="background:#fbb;"
| 2021-02-27 || Loss ||align=left| Strahinja Mitrić || OKTAGON UNDG: Last Man Standing || Brno, Czech Republic || Decision || 3 || 3:00
|-
|-  bgcolor="#CCFFCC"
| 2020-11-28 || Win ||align=left| Michal Turynski  || WAKO K1 World Grand Prix|| Prague, Czech Republic ||  ||  ||
|-
! style=background:white colspan=9 |
|-

|-  bgcolor="#CCFFCC"
| 2020-08-28 || Win ||align=left| Claudiu Istrate  ||  Yangames Fight Night	|| Prague, Czech Republic || KO || 2 ||

|-  bgcolor="#CCFFCC"
| 2019-09-28 || Win ||align=left| Michal Blawdziewicz  || WAKO K1 World Grand Prix|| Czech Republic || TKO || 3 ||

|-  bgcolor="#CCFFCC"
| 2019-07-25 || Win ||align=left| Abderhamane Coulibaly  ||  Yangames Fight Night	||Prague, Czech Republic || KO || 4 ||
|-
! style=background:white colspan=9 |

|-  bgcolor="#CCFFCC"
| 2018-12-29 || Win ||align=left| Nicolae Globu || Noc mistru 13 || Prague, Czech Republic || TKO || 1||
|-
! style=background:white colspan=9 |

|-  style="background:#fbb;"
| 2018-10-06 || Loss ||align=left| Roman Kryklia || FEA World Grand Prix, Semi Finals || Moldova || Decision (Unanimous) || 3 || 3:00

|-  bgcolor="#CCFFCC"
| 2018-07-26 || Win ||align=left| Piotr Romankievich || Yangames Fight Night ||Prague, Czech Republic || KO || 4 ||
|-
! style=background:white colspan=9 |

|-  bgcolor="#CCFFCC"
| 2018-04-20 || Win ||align=left| Sergio Pique ||  Fusion FN ||Brno, Czech Republic || Decision || 5 ||3:00
|-
! style=background:white colspan=9 |

|-  style="background:#cfc;"
| 2018-03-24 || Win ||align=left| Rade Opacic || Night of Warriors 2018 || Liberec, Czech Republic || Decision || 3 || 3:00
|-
|-  style="background:#cfc;"
| 2017-07-27 || Win ||align=left| Roman Kryklia || Yangames Fight Night 2017 || Prague, Czech Republic || Decision || 3 || 3:00
|-
|-  style="background:#fbb;"
| 2017-05-20 || Loss ||align=left| Hesdy Gerges || Glory 41: Holland || Den Bosch, Netherlands ||Decision (Unanimous) || 3 || 3:00 
|-
|-  style="background:#cfc;"
| 2016-10-08 || Win ||align=left| Andrei Stoica || W5 Grand Prix "Legends in Prague" || Prague, Czech Republic || Decision (Unanimous) || 3 || 3:00  
|-
! style=background:white colspan=9 |
|-
|-  style="background:#cfc;"
| 2016-07-28 || Win ||align=left| Kirill Kornilov || Yangame´s Fight Night 2016 || Czech Republic || DQ || 3 || 
|-
|-  style="background:#cfc;"
| 2016-06-03 || Win ||align=left| Hicham Achalhi || FUSION FN6: RINGFIGHT || Brno, Czech Republic || Decision  || 3 || 3:00  
|-
|-  style="background:#fbb;"
| 2016-04-23 || Loss ||align=left| Martin Pacas  || Enfusion Live 39,  Finals || Zilina, Slovakia || Decision || 4 || 
|-
! style=background:white colspan=9 |
|- 
|-  style="background:#cfc;"
| 2016-04-23 || Win ||align=left| Gaetan Sautron  || Enfusion Live 39, Semi Finals || Zilina, Slovakia || TKO|| 3 || 
|-
|-  style="background:#cfc;"
| 2015-12-05 || Win ||align=left| Mighty Mo || GIBU Fight Night 2 || Prague, Czech Republic || KO || 2 || 
|-  style="background:#fbb;"
| 2015-11-14 || Loss ||align=left| Julius Mocka || KOK World GP 2015 In Vilnius - Heavyweight Tournament Final || Vilnius, Lithuania || TKO (Punches) || 2 || 
|-
! style=background:white colspan=9 |
|- 
|-  style="background:#cfc;"
| 2015-11-14 || Win ||align=left| Michal Turynski || KOK World GP 2015 In Vilnius - Heavyweight Tournament Final || Vilnius, Lithuania || Decision (Unanimous) || 3 ||3:00  
|-  style="background:#cfc;"
| 2015-09-26 || Win ||align=left| Colin George || KOK World GP 2015 - Heavyweight Tournament, Quarter Finals || Chisinau, Moldova || KO || 2 || 2:50
|-  style="background:#cfc;"
| 2015-07-30 || Win ||align=left| Igor Bugaenko || Yangame's Fight Night 3 || Prague, Czech Republic || Decision (Unanimous) || 3 ||3:00  
|-  style="background:#cfc;"
| 2015-04-25 || Win ||align=left| Martin Pacas || Gala Night Thaiboxing/ Enfusion Live 28|| Žilina, Slovakia || Decision || 3 ||3:00  
|-  style="background:#fbb;"
| 2015-01-03 || Loss ||align=left| Roman Kryklia || Kunlun Fight 15: The World MAX Return - Super Heavyweight Tournament, Final 16 || Nanjing, China || КО (High Kick) || 1 || 0:30
|-  style="background:#cfc;"
| 2014-06-12 || Win ||align=left| Cătălin Moroșanu || Gibu Fight Night  || Prague, Czech Republic || Decision (Unanimous) || 3 ||3:00  
|-  style="background:#cfc;"
| 2014-04-26 || Win ||align=left| Daniel Lentie || Gala Night Thaiboxing/ Enfusion Live 17|| Žilina, Slovakia || Decision (Unanimous) || 3 ||3:00  
|-  style="background:#cfc;"
| 2014-03-08 || Win ||align=left| Kirk Krouba || Glory 14: Zagreb ||Zagreb, Croatia || Decision (Unanimous) || 3 ||3:00  
|-  style="background:#cfc;"
| 2013-12-13 || Win ||align=left| Igor Mihaljević || FFC10: Rodriguez vs. Batzelas  || Skopje, Macedonia || Decision (Unanimous) || 3 || 3:00
|-  style="background:#cfc;"
| 2013-10-25 || Win ||align=left| Jahfarr Wilnis || FFC08: Zelg vs. Rodriguez || Zagreb, Croatia || Decision (Unanimous) || 3 ||3:00
|-  style="background:#cfc;"
| 2013-06-14 || Win ||align=left| Sebastian Ciobanu || Time of Gladiators || Brno, Czech Republic || Decision (Unanimous) || 3 ||3:00
|-
! style=background:white colspan=9 |
|-  style="background:#cfc;"
| 2013-04-27 || Win ||align=left| Kirk Krouba || Gala Night Thaiboxing || Žilina, Slovakia ||Decision (Unanimous)  || 3 ||3:00
|-  style="background:#cfc;"
| 2012-12-30 || Win ||align=left|  Elmin Živčić || King Combat Promotions  || Prague, Czech Republic || KO (High Kick) || 2 || 
|-  style="background:#cfc;"
| 2012-11-10 || Win ||align=left| Dmytro Bezus || SUPERKOMBAT World Grand Prix 2012 Final Elimination || Craiova, Romania || DQ (Illegal Spinning Elbow) || 3 || N/A
|-  style="background:#cfc;"
| 2012-10-27 || Win ||align=left| Alexey Ignashov || Nitrianska Noc Bojovnikov || Nitra, Slovakia || Decision (Unanimous) || 3 || 3:00
|-  style="background:#cfc;"
| 2012-05-26 || Win ||align=left| Dmytro Bezus || Profiliga Muaythai 12 || Banska Bystrica, Slovakia || Decision (Unanimous) || 3 || 3:00
|-  style="background:#cfc;"
| 2012-03-31 || Win ||align=left| Daniel Sam || Gala night Thaiboxing || Zilina, Slovakia || Decision (Unanimous) || 3 || 3:00
|-  style="background:#cfc;"
| 2011-12-30 || Win ||align=left| Fathi Cam || Enfusion Kickboxing Tournament '11, Super fight || Prague, Czech Republic || KO (Left hook)|| 2 || 
|-  style="background:#fbb;"
| 2011-09-02 || Loss ||align=left| Nathan Corbett || Muaythai Premier League: Round 1 || Long Beach, CA, United States || KO (Punches) || 1 || 2:38
|-  style="background:#fbb;"
| 2011-06-30 || Loss ||align=left| Ismael Londt || || Prague, Czech Republic || Decision (Unaniomus) || 3 || 3:00
|-  style="background:#cfc;"
| 2011-06-03 || Win ||align=left| Shamil Abasov ||  Benlee Cup II || Bratislava, Slovakia || KO (Knee) || 2 || 
|-  style="background:#cfc;"
| 2011-03-12 || Win ||align=left| Erhan Deniz || Gala night Thaiboxing || Zilina, Slovakia || Decision || 3 || 3:00
|-  style="background:#cfc;"
| 2010-12-11 || Win ||align=left| Alexey Ignashov || Yiannis Evgenikos presents: It’s Showtime Athens || Athens, Greece || Decision (4-1) || 3 || 3:00
|-  style="background:#fbb;"
| 2010-05-29 || Loss ||align=left| Rustemi Kreshnik || It's Showtime 2010 Amsterdam || Amsterdam, Netherlands || Decision || 3 || 3:00 
|-  style="background:#cfc;"
| 2010-02-13 || Win ||align=left| Andonias Tzoros || It's Showtime 2010 Prague || Prague, Czech Republic || TKO || 2 || 
|-  style="background:#cfc;"
| 2009-10-16 || Win ||align=left| Ashwin Balrak || Return of the Gladiators || Amsterdam, Netherlands || Decision (unanimous) || 3 || 3:00
|-
! style=background:white colspan=9 |
|-  style="background:#cfc;"
| 2009-06-25 || Win ||align=left| Wendell Roche || Gladiators Games || Prague, Czech Republic || Decision || 3 || 3:00
|-  style="background:#fbb;"
| 2009-05-16 || Loss ||align=left| Daniel Ghiță || It's Showtime 2009 Amsterdam || Amsterdam, Netherlands || TKO (Ref. stop/Left low kicks) || 2 || 
|-  style="background:#cfc;"
| 2009-04-11 || Win ||align=left| Anderson Silva || Amsterdam Fight Club, Final || Amsterdam, Netherlands || Decision || 3 || 3:00
|-
! style=background:white colspan=9 |
|-  style="background:#cfc;"
| 2009-04-11 || Win ||align=left| Benjey Zimmerman || Amsterdam Fight Club, Semi Final || Amsterdam, Netherlands ||  ||  || 
|-  style="background:#fbb;"
| 2009-01-29 || Loss ||align=left| Humberto Evora || Champions League, Semi Final  || Lisbon, Portugal || Decision (Split) || 3 ||3:00
|-  style="background:#cfc;"
| 2008-12-14 || Win ||align=left| Oleg Zdragus || Gladiator ||  || Decision || 3 || 3:00
|-  style="background:#cfc;"
| 2008-11-08 || Win ||align=left| Petar Majstorović || Janus Fight Night "The Legend" || Padova, Italy || Decision || 3 || 3:00
|-  style="background:#cfc;"
| 2008-10-05 || Win ||align=left| Anderson Silva || Tough Is Not Enough || Rotterdam, Netherlands || Decision (Unanimous) || 3 || 3:00
|-
! style=background:white colspan=9 |
|-  style="background:#cfc;"
| 2008-09-20 || Win ||align=left| Robo Gregor || Profiliga Muay Thai VIII || Bratislava, Slovakia || Decision || 3 || 3:00
|-  style="background:#cfc;"
| 2008-05-31 || Win ||align=left| Henriques Zowa || Muay Thai Fight Night || Switzerland || Decision (Unanimous) || 3 || 3:00
|-  style="background:#fbb;"
| 2007-12-24 || Loss ||align=left| Ashwin Balrak || Return of The King 2 || Paramaribo, Suriname || Decision (unanimous) || 3 || 3:00
|-  style="background:#fbb;"
| 2007-10-27 || Loss ||align=left| Alexei Kudin || Angels of Fire II ||  || Decision (Unanimous) || 3 || 3:00
|-  style="background:#cfc;"
| 2007-04-14 || Win ||align=left| Sergei Gur || K-1 Italy Oktagon 2007, Final || Milan, Italy || Decision || 3 || 3:00
|-
! style=background:white colspan=9 |
|-  style="background:#cfc;"
| 2007-04-14 || Win ||align=left| Brice Guidon || K-1 Italy Oktagon 2007, Semi Finals ||Milan, Italy || Decision (2-1) || 3 || 3:00
|-  style="background:#cfc;"
| 2007-04-14 || Win ||align=left| Djamal Kasumov || K-1 Italy Oktagon 2007, Quarter Finals ||Milan, Italy || Decision || 3 || 3:00
|-  style="background:#cfc;"
| 2006-12-22 || Win ||align=left| Slavo Polugic || WKN Kickboxing in Prague || Prague, Czech Republic || TKO || 1 || 
|-
! style=background:white colspan=9 |
|-  style="background:#cfc;"
| 2006-10-28 || Win ||align=left| Tony Scanzano || Die K-1 Superfighter Gala || Germany || Decision || 3 || 3:00
|-  style="background:#fbb;"
| 2005-10-22 || Loss ||align=left| David Keclik || SuperLeague Heavy Knockout 2005 || Vienna, Austria || Decision || 3 || 3:00
|-  style="background:#cfc;"
| 2005-06-24 || Win ||align=left| Igor Jurkovic || Fighters' Night || Krupka, Czech Republic || Decision || 5 || 2:00
|-  style="background:#cfc;"
| 2005-04-22 || Win ||align=left| Thomas Adamantopoulos || Czech Grand Prix Thaiboxing II || Czech Republic || TKO || 1 || 
|-  style="background:#fbb;"
| 2004-11-26 || Loss ||align=left| Errol Zimmerman || Kings of the Ring: Prestige Fights || Brno, Czech Republic || Decision (split) || 5 || 2:00
|-  style="background:#cfc;"
| 2004-07-02 || Win ||align=left| Leonard Sitpholek || Kings of the Ring: World GP 85 kg, Final || Brno, Czech Republic || Decision (Unanimous) || 3 || 3:00
|-
! style=background:white colspan=9 |
|-  style="background:#cfc;"
| 2004-07-02 || Win ||align=left| Errol Zimmerman || Kings of the Ring: World GP 85 kg, Semi Finals || Brno, Czech Republic || Decision (Majority) || 3 || 3:00
|-  style="background:#cfc;"
| 2004-07-02 || Win ||align=left| Frederic Rosenberg || Kings of the Ring: World GP 85 kg, Quarter Finals || Brno, Czech Republic || TKO || 1 || 2:05
|-  style="background:#fbb;"
| 2004-04-17 || Loss ||align=left| Gürkan Özkan || Kings Of The Ring Banja Luka, Semi Finals || Banja Luka, Bosnia and Herzegovina || Decision (Split) || 3 || 3:00
|-  style="background:#cfc;"
| 2004-03-06 || Win ||align=left| Tahir Cerkinaj || Kings Of The Ring  || Priština, Serbia and Montenegro || TKO (Towel thrown) || 3 || 
|-

See also
List of K-1 champions
List of male kickboxers

References

1981 births
Living people
Czech male kickboxers
Heavyweight kickboxers
Czech Muay Thai practitioners
Glory kickboxers
Kunlun Fight kickboxers
SUPERKOMBAT kickboxers
Sportspeople from Brno